Maryland railway station is on the Great Eastern Main Line serving the Maryland area of the London Borough of Newham, east London. Its three-letter station code is MYL and it is in fare zone 3.

The station was opened in 1873 as Maryland Point by the Great Eastern Railway. It was renamed Maryland in 1940.

History
The station was opened by the Great Eastern Railway on its main line out of Bishopsgate on 6 January 1873 with the name Maryland Point. It was fully rebuilt in 1891 when the line capacity was expanded. Its name was shortened to Maryland on 28 October 1940. New station buildings, designed by Thomas Bennett, were opened in 1949.

Of the four platforms, only the two serving the stopping "metro" lines are in regular operation, the others being used only when necessary during engineering works or temporary train path diversions.

The station is one of the primary rail access points for the residential areas in the north of Stratford and the south of Leytonstone in east London. The area surrounding the station has seen much redevelopment in the 21st century, with ongoing improvements underway related to the nearby Olympic Park. Notably, the "twisted clock" timepiece/sculpture formerly installed outside Stratford station was relocated to Maryland.

Maryland was closed between 27 July and 12 August 2012, during the 2012 Olympic Games, as it would have been unable to cope with the large numbers of spectators who might have used it to access the venues nearby at the Olympic Park.

Maryland was added to the planned Crossrail route in 2006 after campaigning by Newham Council, the London Transport Users Committee and others. Transport for London has therefore committed to providing a full service, making use of selective door operation such that doors on some end carriages will not open at Maryland. An agreement was also reached about improving access to the station. The Elizabeth line's precursor TfL Rail took control of the present stopping service at the end of May 2015 from Abellio Greater Anglia, and the new  trains were introduced in June 2017, before the Elizabeth line took full control of the station and services on 24 May 2022.

Services
On Sundays four of the eight trains terminate instead at Gidea Park. The services are currently operated by the Elizabeth line.

Connections
London Buses routes 69, 257, 308, school route 678 and night route N8 serve the station.

References

External links

Stratford, London
Railway stations in the London Borough of Newham
Former Great Eastern Railway stations
Railway stations in Great Britain opened in 1873
Railway stations served by the Elizabeth line
Thomas Penberthy Bennett railway stations